Antônio Rogério Nogueira (born 2 June 1976), also known as Minotouro or Lil Nog, is a Brazilian former mixed martial artist who most recently competed in the UFC. He is the twin brother of Antônio Rodrigo Nogueira, the "Minotauro" (lit. Minotaur), earning Rogério the nickname "Minotouro" (lit. mini bull). A proficient amateur boxer, he was the 2006 and 2007 Brazilian Super Heavyweight Champion. He also won a bronze medal in the 2007 Pan American Games.

Background
Antônio Rogério Nogueira hails from the town of Vitória da Conquista, Brazil and trained in Brazilian Jiu-Jitsu under Ricardo de la Riva.

His brother is a former interim UFC Heavyweight Champion and  PRIDE Heavyweight Champion. Nogueira says that it is not usual for Brazilian twins to have the same first name and that the twins' mother named them both after their father, Antônio Amielto.

Although they are identical twins, Nogueira can be distinguished from his brother by his lighter weight and shorter height, and by the presence of a scar on his brother's lower back.

The twins trained with Brazilian Top Team, then with Black House, and finally at Team Nogueira, where they also work as instructors.

Mixed martial arts career

Early career
Before becoming a big star in PRIDE, Nogueira would compete in DEEP and HooknShoot events and would gain a record of 2-0, finishing both opponents in the very first round via armbar. Nogueira started training with the same team as his brother, Brazilian Top Team.

Pride Fighting Championships
Nogueira would make his PRIDE Fighting Championships debut on 28 April 2002 at PRIDE 20 against Japanese pro wrestler/MMA fighter Yusuke Imamura and he was very successful, ending the fight in the first round with a guillotine choke in just 35 seconds.

Nogueira would lose his next fight to Vladimir Matyushenko by decision but would bounce back with a victory over Tsuyoshi Kohsaka.

Nogueira would fight again for PRIDE at PRIDE 24 against Guy Mezger. Neither man would push the action a whole lot as they both seemed a little tentative in the stand up. The fight would go to the judges scorecards and Nogueira would pick up the majority decision. Nogueira next fought at PRIDE 25 against Kazuhiro Nakamura, who was making his pro MMA debut. Nakamura fought very valiantly and even escaped multiple submissions but in the end the experience and skill of Nogueira proved to be too much and he would finish with an armbar in the second round.

In his next fight with PRIDE Nogueira would see a huge step up in competition for him as he was pitted against legendary fighter and crowd favourite Kazushi Sakuraba in the main event of PRIDE Shockwave 2003. The fight would prove to be an excellent back-and-forth battle which would see Nogueira utilise his excellent ground game and also get the better of Sakuraba standing and in the clinch. Late in the third, he would even bloody up Sakuraba with kicks. Nogueira would go on to take the unanimous decision and by beating such a huge star, he was now seen as a serious force to be reckoned with at 205 lbs.

Nogueira would beat Alex Stiebling in Korea, before returning to Japan to rematch Nakamura in the main event of PRIDE Bushido 4. Nogueira fought a very smart fight and took home the split decision victory. Nogueira won a unanimous decision victory at PRIDE 29 against Alistair Overeem in what was for the most part an even fight. Overeem would escape many of Nogueira's submission attempts but looked tired late in the fight and Nogueira would start to really take it to Overeem, even coming close to finishing him in the third round.

Nogueira would enter PRIDE's 2005 Middleweight Grand Prix next and was not given an easy first round opponent as he was slated to fight Dan Henderson in the opening round. Henderson fought Nogueira's twin brother Antônio Rodrigo Nogueira earlier in his career, and lost by armbar. Henderson would have the same luck against Nogueira and was submitted late in the first round by an armbar, as Nogueira continued on in the tournament. Nogueira was matched up in the quarter-finals against top Chute Boxe prospect Maurício Rua in a Brazilian Top Team/Chute Boxe clash. The first round of this fight is widely considered to be one of the better opening rounds in MMA history, with Nogueira dropping the rarely knocked down Shogun and rocking him later in the round while Shogun mounted some nice offense of his own, connecting with some diving punches to Nogueira and taking him down. The second and third rounds would belong to Rua however, as he would continue to land diving punches and knocked Nogueira down in the third. Rua would go on to take the decision and eventually would go on to win the tournament. This fight snapped Nogueira's eight fight winning streak and would be the first fight he lost in three years.

After this fight Nogueira took some time off to heal some old injuries of his and would not fight again until July 2006, where he rematched Overeem and would win a second-round TKO decision, when Overeem's corner threw in the towel after Nogueira staggered him and was continuing to land combos.

Nogueira fought in the United States for only the second time in his career at PRIDE 33 against relatively unknown Sokoudjou. However the fight would be Sokoudjou's arrival into the mainstream MMA audience, as he would land a high kick/left hook combo that knocked Nogueira out cleanly in what is considered to be one of the biggest upsets in all of MMA. PRIDE would close its doors soon after this and Nogueira would defeat Todd Gouwenberg at an HCF show before signing a contract to compete with Affliction Entertainment on their Affliction branded shows. Nogueira would fight Edwin Dewees next, knocking him out in the first round at Affliction: Banned, before defeating Moise Rimbon at a Sengoku show. Next, Nogueira was given a chance to avenge an earlier loss and would fight Vladimir Matyushenko at Affliction: Day of Reckoning and would indeed avenge it, knocking Matyushenko out late in the second round. After this Nogueira would submit Dion Staring in an MMA fight that took place in Brazil.

After Affliction closed its doors in July 2009, Nogueira would sign on to compete with the Ultimate Fighting Championship.

Ultimate Fighting Championship
On 28 August 2009, Dana White had confirmed that Nogueira had signed a contract with the UFC. Nogueira made his debut at UFC 106 against Luiz Cané. Nogueira made quick work of the Brazilian and dropped him with a sweeping left hook before finishing him off with punches on the mat at 1:56 of the first round.

Nogueira was scheduled to face Brandon Vera at UFC 109. However, Nogueira was forced off the card with a fractured ankle sustained while training.

His next fight was scheduled to be against former UFC Light-Heavyweight Champion Forrest Griffin at UFC 114; however, Griffin pulled out of the fight due to a shoulder injury. Nogueira instead fought  Jason Brilz on short notice. In a controversial split decision, in which Brilz seemed to control the duration of the fight, Nogueira was declared the winner.

Nogueira faced undefeated, TUF 8 winner Ryan Bader on 25 September 2010 at UFC 119.  He lost the fight via unanimous decision.

Nogueira was expected to face Tito Ortiz on 26 March 2011 at UFC Fight Night 24. However, Ortiz received a cut whilst training for his match with Nogueira and was forced to withdraw from the match. Ortiz was replaced by Phil Davis on short-notice, with just 6 weeks remaining until the fight. Nogueira lost via unanimous decision (30-27, 30-27, 30-27).

Nogueira was originally scheduled to face Rich Franklin at UFC 133 on 6 August 2011, in Philadelphia. However, Nogueira pulled out of the fight, citing a shoulder injury.

Nogueira defeated former UFC Light Heavyweight Champion Tito Ortiz on 10 December 2011 at UFC 140 via TKO (punches and elbows to the body) in the first round. In 3:15, he landed 54 significant strikes, the most of his UFC career.

Nogueira was expected to face Alexander Gustafsson on 14 April 2012 at UFC on Fuel TV 2.  However, on 6 March, it was announced that Nogueira had pulled out of the bout, citing a knee injury.

Nogueira faced former UFC Light Heavyweight Champion Rashad Evans on 2 February 2013 at UFC 156. The bout remained on the feet for a majority of its duration in a largely uneventful fight where neither fighter was able to deliver any significant offense. Nogueira won the fight via unanimous decision.

Nogueira was expected to face Maurício Rua in a rematch on 15 June 2013 at UFC 161.  However, Nogueira pulled out of the bout in the days leading up to the event citing a back injury.  Chael Sonnen was briefly linked as a replacement for Nogueira.  Though an alleged visa issue created a problem for Sonnen to get into Canada, resulting in Rua being pulled from the event altogether.

At a post-fight press conference in Manchester, Dana White said that Nogueira would be facing Alexander Gustafsson on 8 March 2014 at a UFC event in London. However just 5 days later Nogueira was forced out of the bout due to a lingering back injury. Later, reports came that said that Nogueira had never agreed to take the fight against Gustafsson at all.

Nogueira next faced Anthony Johnson on 26 July 2014 at UFC on Fox 12. He lost the fight via KO in the first round.

Ten years after their first fight, Nogueira had a rematch with Maurício Rua on 1 August 2015 at UFC 190. He lost the fight again by unanimous decision. Both participants were awarded Fight of the Night honors.

Nogueira next faced Patrick Cummins on 14 May 2016 at UFC 198. He won the fight via TKO in the first round.

A pairing with Alexander Gustafsson was scheduled for a third time and was expected to take place on 19 November 2016 at UFC Fight Night 100. However just days after the fight was announced, Gustafsson pulled out of the bout citing an injury. In turn, he was replaced by Ryan Bader. Nogueira lost the one-sided fight via TKO in the third round.

Nogueira was expected to face Ilir Latifi on 25 June 2017 at UFC Fight Night 112. However Nogueira pulled out of the fight on 17 May citing a neck injury.

Nogueira was to face Jared Cannonier on 16 December 2017 at UFC on Fox 26. However he was pulled from the bout on 19 October 2017 after being flagged by USADA for a potential violation.  On 24 April 2018 Nogueira was cleared of intentionally using of Performance-enhancing drugs (PEDs) by USADA, as Nogueira had allegedly taken a tainted supplement which contained hydrochlorothiazide from the compounding pharmacies in Brazil.

In his first fight since returning from injury and suspension, Nogueira faced Sam Alvey on 22 September 2018 at UFC Fight Night 137. He won the fight via knockout in the second round. This win earned him the Performance of the Night award.

Nogueira faced Ryan Spann on 11 May 2019 at UFC 237. He lost the fight via knockout in the first round.

Nogueira was expected to face Trevor Smith on 16 November 2019 at UFC on ESPN+ 22. However, Nogueira was forced to pull out of the event due to injury, resulting in the cancellation of the bout.

As the final fight of his prevailing contract, the trilogy bout with Maurício Rua was expected to take place on May 9, 2020 at then UFC 250. Due to the event being relocated to the United States, Nogueira was unable to compete due to visa issues. On April 9, Dana White, the president of UFC announced that the event was postponed to a future date The bout eventually took place on July 26, 2020 at UFC on ESPN 14. He lost the fight via split decision and retired from professional mma competition after the fight.

Personal life
Nogueira and his wife welcomed their first daughter on 25 January 2010.

Championships and accomplishments

Boxing

Mixed martial arts
Ultimate Fighting Championship
Knockout of the Night (One time) vs. Luiz Cané 
Fight of the Night (Two times)  vs. Jason Brilz and Maurício Rua
Performance of the Night (One time)  vs. Sam Alvey
Sherdog
Fight of the Year (2005) vs. Maurício Rua on 26 June 2005

Mixed martial arts record

|-
|Loss
|align=center|23–10
|Maurício Rua
|Decision (split)
|UFC on ESPN: Whittaker vs. Till 
|
|align=center|3
|align=center|5:00
|Abu Dhabi, United Arab Emirates
|
|- 
|Loss
|align=center|23–9
|Ryan Spann
|KO (punches)
|UFC 237
|
|align=center|1
|align=center|2:07
|Rio de Janeiro, Brazil
|
|-
|Win
| align=center| 23–8
| Sam Alvey
| TKO (punches)
| UFC Fight Night: Santos vs. Anders 
| 
| align=center|2
| align=center|1:00
| São Paulo, Brazil
| 

|-
| Loss
| align=center| 22–8
| Ryan Bader
| TKO (punches)
| UFC Fight Night: Bader vs. Nogueira 2
| 
| align=center|3 
| align=center|3:51
| São Paulo, Brazil
|  
|-
|Win
|align=center|22–7
|Patrick Cummins
|TKO (punches)
|UFC 198
|
|align=center|1
|align=center|4:52
|Curitiba, Brazil
| 
|-
|Loss
|align=center|21–7
|Maurício Rua
|Decision (unanimous)
|UFC 190
|
|align=center|3
|align=center|5:00
|Rio de Janeiro, Brazil
|
|-
| Loss
| align=center| 21–6
| Anthony Johnson
| KO (punches) 
| UFC on Fox: Lawler vs. Brown
| 
| align=center|1
| align=center|0:44
| San Jose, California, United States
|
|-
| Win
| align=center| 21–5
| Rashad Evans
| Decision (unanimous)
| UFC 156
| 
| align=center| 3
| align=center| 5:00
| Las Vegas, Nevada, United States
| 
|-
| Win
| align=center| 20–5
| Tito Ortiz
| TKO (punches and elbows to the body)
| UFC 140
| 
| align=center| 1
| align=center| 3:15
| Toronto, Ontario, Canada
| 
|-
| Loss
| align=center| 19–5
| Phil Davis
| Decision (unanimous)
| UFC Fight Night: Nogueira vs. Davis
|  
| align=center| 3
| align=center| 5:00
| Seattle, Washington, United States
| 
|-
| Loss
| align=center| 19–4
| Ryan Bader
| Decision (unanimous)
| UFC 119
| 
| align=center| 3
| align=center| 5:00
| Indianapolis, Indiana, United States
| 
|-
| Win
| align=center| 19–3
| Jason Brilz
| Decision (split)
| UFC 114
| 
| align=center| 3
| align=center| 5:00
| Las Vegas, Nevada, United States
| 
|-
| Win
| align=center| 18–3
| Luiz Cané
| TKO (punches)
| UFC 106
| 
| align=center| 1
| align=center| 1:56
| Las Vegas, Nevada, United States
| 
|-
| Win
| align=center| 17–3
| Dion Staring
| Submission (triangle choke)
| Jungle Fight 14: Ceará
| 
| align=center| 3
| align=center| 3:30
| Fortaleza, Brazil
| 
|-
| Win
| align=center| 16–3
| Vladimir Matyushenko
| KO (knee)
| Affliction: Day of Reckoning
| 
| align=center| 2
| align=center| 4:26
| Anaheim, California, United States
| 
|-
| Win
| align=center| 15–3
| Moise Rimbon
| Decision (unanimous)
| World Victory Road Presents: Sengoku 6
| 
| align=center| 3
| align=center| 5:00
| Saitama, Japan
|
|-
| Win
| align=center| 14–3
| Edwin Dewees
| TKO (punches)
| Affliction: Banned
| 
| align=center| 1
| align=center| 4:06
| Anaheim, California, United States
|
|-
| Win
| align=center| 13–3
| Todd Gouwenberg
| TKO (knees and punches)
| HCF: Destiny
|
| align=center| 2
| align=center| 4:34
| Calgary, Alberta, Canada
|
|-
| Loss
| align=center| 12–3
| Rameau Thierry Sokoudjou
| KO (punch)
| Pride 33
| 
| align=center| 1
| align=center| 0:23
| Las Vegas, Nevada, United States
| 
|-
| Win
| align=center| 12–2
| Alistair Overeem
| TKO (corner stoppage)
| Pride FC: Critical Countdown Absolute
| 
| align=center| 2
| align=center| 2:13
| Saitama, Japan 
| 
|-
| Loss
| align=center| 11–2
| Maurício Rua
| Decision (unanimous)
| Pride Critical Countdown 2005
| 
| align=center| 3
| align=center| 5:00
| Saitama, Japan
| 
|-
| Win
| align=center| 11–1
| Dan Henderson
| Submission (armbar)
| Pride Total Elimination 2005
| 
| align=center| 1
| align=center| 8:05
| Osaka, Japan
| 
|-
| Win
| align=center| 10–1
| Alistair Overeem
| Decision (unanimous)
| Pride 29
| 
| align=center| 3
| align=center| 5:00
| Saitama, Japan 
| 
|-
| Win
| align=center| 9–1
| Kazuhiro Nakamura
| Decision (split)
| Pride Bushido 4
| 
| align=center| 2
| align=center| 5:00
| Nagoya, Japan
| 
|-
| Win
| align=center| 8–1
| Alex Stiebling
| Decision (unanimous)
| Gladiator FC Day 1
| 
| align=center| 3
| align=center| 5:00
| Seoul, South Korea
| 
|-
| Win
| align=center| 7–1
| Kazushi Sakuraba
| Decision (unanimous)
| Pride Shockwave 2003
| 
| align=center| 3
| align=center| 5:00
| Saitama, Japan
| 
|-
| Win
| align=center| 6–1
| Kazuhiro Nakamura
| Submission (armbar)
| Pride 25
| 
| align=center| 2
| align=center| 3:49
| Yokohama, Japan
| 
|-
| Win
| align=center| 5–1
| Guy Mezger
| Decision (split)
| Pride 24
| 
| align=center| 3
| align=center| 5:00
| Fukuoka, Japan
| 
|-
| Win
| align=center| 4–1
| Tsuyoshi Kohsaka
| Decision (unanimous)
| Deep - 6th Impact
| 
| align=center| 3
| align=center| 5:00
| Tokyo, Japan
|
|-
| Loss
| align=center| 3–1
| Vladimir Matyushenko
| Decision (unanimous)
| UFO Legend
| 
| align=center| 3
| align=center| 5:00
| Tokyo, Japan
| 
|-
| Win
| align=center| 3–0
| Yusuke Imamura
| Submission (guillotine choke)
| Pride 20
| 
| align=center| 1
| align=center| 0:35
| Yokohama, Japan
|
|-
| Win
| align=center| 2–0
| Jim Theobald
| Submission (armbar)
| HooknShoot Overdrive
| 
| align=center| 1
| align=center| 4:59
| Evansville, Indiana, United States
| 
|-
| Win
| align=center| 1–0
| Katsuhisa Fujii
| Technical Submission (armbar)
| Deep - 2nd Impact
| 
| align=center| 1
| align=center| 3:59
| Yokohama, Japan
|

Professional boxing record

See also
 List of current UFC fighters
 List of male mixed martial artists

References

External links

1976 births
Living people
Brazilian male mixed martial artists
Light heavyweight mixed martial artists
Mixed martial artists utilizing boxing
Mixed martial artists utilizing Brazilian jiu-jitsu
Mixed martial artists utilizing judo
Brazilian practitioners of Brazilian jiu-jitsu
People awarded a black belt in Brazilian jiu-jitsu
Brazilian male judoka
People from Vitória da Conquista
Identical twins
Twin sportspeople
Brazilian twins
Brazilian male boxers
Pan American Games bronze medalists for Brazil
Pan American Games medalists in boxing
South American Games gold medalists for Brazil
South American Games medalists in boxing
Boxers at the 2007 Pan American Games
Competitors at the 2006 South American Games
Ultimate Fighting Championship male fighters
Super-heavyweight boxers
Medalists at the 2007 Pan American Games
Sportspeople from Bahia